Maja Matarić is an American computer scientist, roboticist and AI researcher, and the Chan Soon-Shiong Distinguished Professor of Computer Science, Neuroscience, and Pediatrics at the University of Southern California. She is known for her work in human-robot interaction for socially assistive robotics, a new field she pioneered,  which focuses on creating robots capable of providing personalized therapy and care that helps people help themselves, through social rather than physical interaction. Her work has focused on aiding special needs populations including the elderly, stroke patients, and children with autism, and has been deployed and evaluated in hospitals, therapy centers, schools, and homes. She is also known for her earlier work on robot learning from demonstration, swarm robotics, robot teams, and robot navigation.

Matarić is also known for her many outreach activities aimed at engaging children, youth, educators, women, and other groups that are under-represented in computing, engineering, and science.

Biography 
Matarić was born in Belgrade, the capital of the former Yugoslavia. She did her undergraduate studies at the University of Kansas. She then moved to the Massachusetts Institute of Technology (MIT), where she earned her MSc in 1990 and her Ph.D. in 1994, both under the supervision of Rodney A. Brooks. She joined the faculty at Brandeis University as an assistant professor of Computer Science in January 1995, then moved to the University of Southern California in 1997 as an assistant professor of Computer Science with a courtesy appointment in the Neuroscience Program. There she was promoted to associate professor, received a courtesy appointment in the Department of Pediatrics, and was then promoted to Professor.  She served as the Chair of the Women in Science and Engineering Committee of the Viterbi School of Engineering (2005), as the elected President of the USC Faculty and the Academic Senate (2006-2007), Senior Associate Dean for Research in the Viterbi School of Engineering (2006–2011), Vice Dean for Research in the Viterbi School of Engineering (2011–2019), and interim Vice President of Research (2020–2021).

Awards and honors 
Matarić received the Presidential Award for Excellence in Science, Mathematics, and Engineering Mentoring from President Barack Obama (2009). She was the winner of the 2013 ABIE Award for Innovation from the Anita Borg Institute. She is a Fellow of the American Association for the Advancement of Science (AAAS), Fellow of the IEEE, Fellow of AAAI, Fellow of the ACM, and a recipient of the Okawa Foundation Award, the National Science Foundation Career Award, the MIT Technology Review TR35 Award, and the IEEE Robotics and Automation Society Early Career Award. She is a member of the Phi Kappa Phi, is one of five LA Times Magazine 2010 Visionaries, and is featured in the Emmy Award-nominated documentary Me & Isaac Newton and in the New Yorker article "Robots that Care", Popular Science article "The New Face of Autism Therapy", the IEEE Spectrum article "Caregiver Robots", The Wall Street Journal article "How to Build Robots People Can Relate To", the BBC News, among many others.

References

External links 
 Professional website
 
 Maja Matarić interview with impactmania
 "Socially Assistive Robots and the Growing Healthcare Problem", TEDx talk, Sep 15, 2010.
 Complete listing of media coverage with links

Living people
American women computer scientists
American computer scientists
20th-century American women scientists
21st-century American women scientists
Year of birth missing (living people)
Yugoslav emigrants to the United States
Scientists from Belgrade
University of Southern California faculty
University of Kansas alumni
Massachusetts Institute of Technology alumni
Brandeis University faculty
American roboticists
Women roboticists
Fellow Members of the IEEE
Fellows of the Association for the Advancement of Artificial Intelligence
Serbian women engineers